The 2019–20 season is Sarmiento's 3rd consecutive season in the second division of Argentine football, Primera B Nacional.

The season generally covers the period from 1 July 2019 to 30 June 2020.

Review

Pre-season
Sebastián Cavallin was loaned to Bolivian Copa Simón Bolívar side Universitario de Sucre on 5 June 2019, while Daniel Garro agreed a move to Deportivo Maipú a day later. Matías Garrido was revealed as their third outgoing on 23 June, as Honduras outfit Olimpia announced him as a new signing. Nicolás Castro left for San Martín (T) on 29 June, twenty-four hours prior to Iván Etevenaux's contract expiring. June concluded with Guillermo Farré penning terms with Mitre. July began with the departures of Nicolás Miracco (Central Córdoba) and Guillermo Sotelo (Brown), before Iván Delfino secured his opening reinforcements on 3 July in Francisco Molina (Alvarado) and Fernando Núñez (Godoy Cruz, loan). On 4 July, Sotelo was joined in Adrogué at Brown by Ariel Kippes.

Claudio Pombo agreed to come to Sarmiento on 6 July, arriving from Atlético Tucumán of the Primera División. Three more leavers were confirmed on 12 July, as Sebastián Penco headed to Peru with Sport Boys while Leonardo Villalba and Nicolás Orsini signed for Central Córdoba and Lanús respectively. 15 July saw Pablo Magnín join from Temperley, on the same date that Gianfranco Ottaviani was loaned to Cañuelas on. Gabriel Graciani became Sarmiento's fifth incoming on 16 July. He joined from Olimpo, who completed loan deals with Sarmiento on 21 July for Maximiliano Méndez and Pablo Fernández. The club got two players on 23 July, with Federico Vismara and Fabio Vázquez arriving. Agropecuario were Sarmiento's first friendly opponents on 24 July.

Sarmiento met Agropecuario again in pre-season on 27 July, with the opposition leaving undefeated; unlike days prior. Santiago Rosa secured a loan move to Spanish football with Segunda División B's Peña Deportiva on 30 July. Gabriel Sanabria also sealed a move to European football that day, as he went to Greece with Levadiakos. Newell's Old Boys faced Sarmiento in pre-season matches on 31 July, as they each achieved a victory; Pablo Magnín scored twice in their 2–1 win. Joaquín Vivani joined Ferro Carril Oeste (GP) on 4 August. The loan arrival of Facundo Castelli (Instituto) was made official on 6 August. Also on 6 August, Rosario Central were met in friendlies. Sarmiento drew with Unión Santa Fe in a friendly on 9 August, prior to beating them in the other fixture.

Diego Cháves arrived from Deportivo Morón on 12 August. Enrique Taddei's move in from Olimpo was communicated on 13 August. 14 August saw Lautaro Geminiani put pen to paper on a contract from Patronato.

August
Sarmiento's Primera B Nacional campaign got underway with a goalless draw at the Estadio Eva Perón versus Santamarina on 17 August. They secured their first three points on matchday two as they edged a five-goal thriller with Instituto on 22 August. Pablo Magnín netted twice in that fixture, prior to scoring again a week later against San Martín (T).

Squad

Transfers
Domestic transfer windows:3 July 2019 to 24 September 201920 January 2020 to 19 February 2020.

Transfers in

Transfers out

Loans in

Loans out

Friendlies

Pre-season
Sarmiento met Agropecuario for two friendlies on 24 July, before meeting again days later for a further two encounters. The rest of their schedule was filled with matches against Primera División trio Newell's Old Boys, Rosario Central and Unión Santa Fe.

Competitions

Primera B Nacional

Results summary

Matches
The fixtures for the 2019–20 league season were announced on 1 August 2019, with a new format of split zones being introduced. Santamarina were drawn in Zone B.

Squad statistics

Appearances and goals

Statistics accurate as of 3 September 2019.

Goalscorers

Notes

References

Club Atlético Sarmiento seasons
Sarmiento